The Producers is a 1967 American satirical black comedy film written and directed by Mel Brooks in his directorial debut and starring Zero Mostel, Gene Wilder, Dick Shawn, and Kenneth Mars. The film is about a theater producer and his accountant who, as part of a scam, decide to stage the worst stage musical they can create. They find a script celebrating Adolf Hitler and the Nazis and bring it to the stage. Because of this theme, The Producers was controversial from the start and received mixed reviews. It became a cult film and found a more positive critical reception later.

The Producers was Brooks's directorial debut. For the film, he won an Academy Award for Best Original Screenplay. In 1996, the film was selected for preservation in the United States National Film Registry by the Library of Congress as being "culturally, historically, or aesthetically significant" and placed eleventh on the AFI's 100 Years...100 Laughs list. It was later adapted by Brooks and Thomas Meehan as a stage musical, which itself was adapted into a film.

Plot
Max Bialystock (Zero Mostel) is an aging, fraudulent, corruptible, and greedy Broadway producer past his prime who ekes out a hand-to-mouth existence romancing lascivious, wealthy elderly women in exchange for money for a "next play" that may never be produced. Accountant Leopold "Leo" Bloom (Gene Wilder), a nervous young man prone to hysterics, arrives at Max's office to audit his accounts and discovers a $2,000 discrepancy in the accounts of Max's last play. Max persuades Leo to hide the relatively minor fraud, and while shuffling numbers, Leo has a revelation—a producer can make a lot more money with a flop than a hit by overselling shares in the production, because no one will audit the books of a play presumed to have lost money. For this same reason, no duped investor will be aware of the many others, thus protecting the pair from charges of fraud. Max instantly puts this scheme into action. They will oversell shares on a massive scale and produce a play that will close on opening night, thus avoiding payouts and leaving the duo free to flee to Rio de Janeiro with the profits. Leo is afraid such a criminal venture will fail and they will go to prison, but Max eventually convinces him that his current drab existence is no better than prison.

The partners find the ideal play for their scheme: Springtime for Hitler: A Gay Romp with Adolf and Eva at Berchtesgaden. It is "a love letter to Hitler" written in total sincerity by deranged ex-Nazi Franz Liebkind (Kenneth Mars). Max and Leo persuade Liebkind to sign over the stage rights, telling him they want to show the world a positive representation of Hitler. To guarantee the show is a flop, they hire Roger De Bris (Christopher Hewett), a director whose plays "close on the first day of rehearsal." The part of Hitler goes to a charismatic but barely coherent flower power hippie named Lorenzo Saint DuBois, also known as L.S.D. (Dick Shawn), who had mistakenly wandered into the theater during the casting call. Max sells 25,000% of the play to his regular investors. At the theatre on opening night, Max tries to ensure a truly terrible review by attempting to bribe the critic who came to see the show. As expected, the man is outraged and hurls the money Max wrapped around the tickets he gave him at Max's feet. Max and Leo sneak off to a bar across the street to wait for the audience to storm out once they actually see the show.

The play opens with a lavish production of the title song, "Springtime for Hitler", which celebrates Nazi Germany crushing Europe ("Springtime for Hitler and Germany/Winter for Poland and France"). The audience is horrified and rises en masse after the number. At this point L.S.D. comes on stage as Hitler, and it is evident from his beatnik-like portrayal that De Bris has altered the script and directed the play as a satire. Meanwhile, L.S.D.'s portrayal of Hitler enrages and humiliates Franz, who—after dropping the curtain and rushing out on stage—confronts the audience and rants about the treatment of his beloved play. He is knocked out and removed from the stage, and the audience assumes that his rant was part of the act. To Max and Leo's shock and horror, Springtime for Hitler is declared a comic smash hit, which means that the investors will be expecting a larger financial return than can be paid out.

A gun-wielding Franz confronts Max and Leo, accusing them of breaking the "Siegfried Oath". He tries first to shoot them, and then himself, but runs out of bullets. The three then decide to blow up the theater to end the production, but they are injured, arrested, tried, and found "incredibly guilty" by the jury. Before sentencing, Leo makes an impassioned statement praising Max for being his friend and changing his life.  Max tells the judge that they have learned their lesson.

Max, Leo, and Franz are sent to the state penitentiary. There they produce a new musical called Prisoners of Love, a show which looks even worse than Springtime for Hitler, mostly because Leo and Max are striving to make a good play instead of a bad one. While Max and Franz earnestly supervise rehearsals, Leo continues their old scam—overselling shares of the play to their fellow prisoners, and even to the warden. The song "Prisoners of Love" plays while the credits roll.

Cast 

 Zero Mostel as Max Bialystock
 Gene Wilder as Leopold "Leo" Bloom
 Dick Shawn as Lorenzo St. DuBois (L.S.D.)
 Estelle Winwood as "Hold Me! Touch Me!"
 Christopher Hewett as Roger De Bris
 Kenneth Mars as Franz Liebkind
 Lee Meredith as Ulla
 Renée Taylor as actress playing Eva Braun
 Andreas Voutsinas as Carmen Ghia
 Bill Macy as Foreman of the jury
 William Hickey as the drunk in bar (credited as Bill Hickey)
 David Patch as actor playing Joseph Goebbels
 Barney Martin as actor playing Hermann Göring
 Madelyn Cates as Concierge ("I'm not a madam!")
 Shimen Ruskin as The Landlord
 Frank Campanella as The Bartender
 Josip Elic as Violinist
 John Zoller as Drama Critic
 Brutus Peck as Hot Dog Vendor
 Mel Brooks as Singer in "Springtime for Hitler" (voiceover cameo, uncredited)
The Ladies
 Anne Ives
 Amelie Barleon
 Elsie Kirk
 Nell Harrison
 Mary Love

Production

Writing and development 
The title Springtime for Hitler was first coined by  Brooks as a joke during the press conference for All American in 1962. Shortly afterwards, he also decided to relate this title to a character named Leo Bloom, an homage to Leopold Bloom, protagonist of James Joyce's Ulysses. It was reused by him years later once he had an idea about "two schnooks on Broadway who set out to produce a flop and swindle the backers". The inspiration was some people Brooks met during his early show business days: Benjamin Kutcher, a New York producer who financed his plays by sleeping with elderly women, became the basis for Max Bialystock, and the scheme had origins in two theater producers who had a lavish lifestyle while making various unsuccessful plays. When imagining what play "would have people packing up and leaving the theatre even before the first act is over", Brooks decided to combine Adolf Hitler and a musical. Brooks, in a 2001 episode of 60 Minutes, stated that, while serving in the army, he would be called "Jew boy", and lightheartedly admitted that he made The Producers to "get even" with antisemites, particularly Hitler. In another interview, he further explained his reasoning, stating,

Brooks first envisioned his story as a novel, and changed it to a play when publishers told him it had "too much dialogue. Not enough narrative". He wrote the script in nine months, with the help of secretary Alfa-Betty Olsen. During the process, he mentioned in an October 1966 interview with Playboy that he was working on Springtime for Hitler, "a play within a play, or a play within a film – I haven't decided yet". Then, it evolved into a screenplay to take advantage of various settings, as "it could go places, it wouldn’t have to stay in the office".

As Brooks sought backers for his 30-page film treatment, both major film studios and independent filmmakers rejected Springtime for Hitler, finding the idea of using Hitler for comedy outrageous and tasteless (with some even stating that they would consider the script if Brooks changed it to Springtime for Mussolini). This changed as Brooks's agent arranged him to have a meeting with a friend of his, New York producer Sidney Glazier. Glazier laughed so much at Brooks' performance of the script, he accepted the project by saying, "We’re gonna make it! I don't know how, but we're gonna make this movie!"

Glazier budgeted the film at $1 million, and sought financiers. Half the money came from philanthropist Louis Wolfson, who liked the idea of laughing at a dictator, and the remainder, along with the distribution, was arranged by Joseph E. Levine of Embassy Pictures. Levine's only condition was to change the title, as he felt many distributors would not carry a picture named Springtime for Hitler. Brooks renamed it The Producers, considering it ironic as "these guys are anything but producers". As Brooks "couldn't think of anybody to direct it", eventually he decided to take the task for himself, even though he himself had only directed one play before. While Levine was insecure in having an inexperienced director, Brooks convinced him by saying it would be cost-effective, and he knew how to do physical comedy after being a stage manager in Your Show of Shows.

Casting 
Brooks wanted Samuel "Zero" Mostel as Max Bialystock, feeling he was an energetic actor who could convey such an egotistical character. Glazier sent the script to Mostel's lawyer, but the attorney hated it and never showed it to the actor. Eventually, Brooks had to send the script through Mostel's wife Kathryn Harkin. While Mostel did not like the prospect of playing "a Jewish producer going to bed with old women on the brink of the grave", his wife liked the script so much, she eventually convinced him to accept the role. Mostel allowed all his pent-up hostilities towards all the sources of his professional disappointments to spill over into his performance as Bialystock, making his a bitter, hate-filled, and often angry interpretation.

Gene Wilder met Brooks in 1963, as Wilder performed with Brooks' then-girlfriend Anne Bancroft in a stage adaptation of Mother Courage. Wilder complained that the audience was laughing at his serious performance, and Brooks replied that Wilder was "a natural comic, you look like Harpo Marx", and said he would cast him as Leo Bloom once he finished the then-titled Springtime for Hitler. When production arrived, Peter Sellers accepted an invitation to play Leo Bloom, but he never contacted again, so Brooks remembered Wilder, who was about to make his film debut in Bonnie and Clyde. Wilder received the script to The Producers as Brooks visited him backstage during a performance of Luv, and his co-star Renée Taylor was brought for a brief appearance as the actress playing Eva Braun.

Dustin Hoffman was originally cast as Liebkind. According to Brooks, late on the night before shooting began, Hoffman begged Brooks to let him out of his commitment to do the role so he could audition for the starring role in The Graduate. Brooks was aware of the film, which co-starred Anne Bancroft (later Brooks' wife), and, skeptical that Hoffman would get the role, agreed to let him audition. When Hoffman did win the role of Ben Braddock, Brooks called in Kenneth Mars as Liebkind. Mars was originally invited because Brooks envisioned him as Roger De Bris, given he played a gay psychiatrist on Broadway. Instead, Mars was interested in Liebkind's role, which was his film debut and had him remain on the role while not filming as method acting. De Bris was instead portrayed by Christopher Hewett, the first actor who read for the role.

Once recent American Academy of Dramatic Arts graduate Lee Meredith was invited to audition, she was given the condition of knowing a Swedish accent. She borrowed a book from the AADA library to learn the accent, and won the role of Ulla with the screen test featuring the scene of her dancing. Bancroft suggested her friend Andréas Voutsinas for the role of Carmen Ghia, feeling his thick Greek accent would fit. Brooks thought of Dick Shawn to play Lorenzo "L.S.D." Saint DuBois, and the actor accepted for both liking the part and having no work. Writer-director Mel Brooks is heard briefly in the film, his voice dubbed over a dancer singing, "Don't be stupid, be a smarty / Come and join the Nazi Party", in the song "Springtime For Hitler". His version of the line is also dubbed into each performance of the musical, as well as the 2005 movie version.

Filming 
Principal photography for The Producers began on May 22, 1967. Filming had to be done in 40 days on a $941,000 budget, and Brooks managed to fit both requests. The primary location was the Chelsea Studios in New York City, where the musical version (2005) was also shot. The now-demolished Playhouse Theatre hosted the Springtime for Hitler play, and various actors who heard the film was seeking an actor for Hitler were cast in the musical number. The crew tried to film on location whenever possible, filming on such midtown Manhattan locales as Central Park, the Empire State Building, and Lincoln Center.

Brooks's lack of knowledge of filmmaking had him committing many mistakes during production, requiring the help of assistant director Michael Hertzberg. Being both inexperienced and insecure, Brooks started to have tantrums and behave angrily. He got impatient with the slow development compared to how quick television production was, temporarily banned Glazier from the set, berated a visiting reporter from The New York Times, and had clashes with cinematographer Joseph Coffey and main actor Zero Mostel. Mostel also had a troublesome behavior caused by a leg injury received in a 1960 bus accident, which made his contract feature a clause dismissing Mostel from any work after 5:30 pm. Given the fact that the leg injury got worse in humid weather, the last scene, filmed at the Revson Fountain in Lincoln Center, had Mostel throwing a fit and giving up on production. Glazier had to leave a dentist's appointment and rush to the set where Mostel and Brooks were arguing, and once the producer managed to calm them down, the resulting scene had to be shot all night long.

Despite being described as a lavish production number, "Springtime for Hitler" was not ready until the first rehearsals. Brooks sat with Olsen and first-time composer John Morris at the piano, and improvised some lyrics. Morris then developed the stage performance with choreographer Alan Johnson, instructed to do the number "big, wonderful, flashy, but terrible". As Brooks kept suggesting bizarre costume ideas to enhance the burlesque nature of "Springtime for Hitler", such as women with clothes inspired by beer mugs and pretzels, Johnson decided to showcase them all in a parade.

Few scenes had to be altered from the original script. Leo and Max would visit the Parachute Jump in Coney Island, but the attraction was closed by the time filming began. Brooks filmed Liebkind making Max and Leo swear the Siegfried Oath, where they promised fealty to Siegfried, accompanied by The Ride of the Valkyries and wearing horned helmets. But feeling that it "went overboard", Brooks cut the scene, which was restored in the stage adaptation.

The art direction and costumes emphasized the color yellow, which Brooks considered a funny color. For the posters in Bialystock's office, production designer Charles Rosen found a collector in the Theater District and doctored a few posters to include the character's name. Rosen also incorporated an anecdote of his life, as he had to share a small elevator with a flamboyant Broadway director, to design the lift at Roger De Bris's house. Principal photography ended on July 15, 1967. Post-production extended for months, as Brooks had gotten final cut privilege, but still had complaints with Ralph Rosenblum regarding his editing.

Release 
According to Brooks, after the film was completed, Embassy executives refused to release it as being in "bad taste". The film's premiere in Pittsburgh, Pennsylvania, on November 22, 1967, was a disaster and the studio considered shelving it. However, relief came when Pink Panther star Peter Sellers saw the film privately and placed an advertisement in Variety in support of the film's wide release. Sellers was familiar with the film because, according to Brooks, Sellers "had accepted the role of Bloom and then was never heard from again". The film allegedly was "banned in Germany". The film was screened in New York City in March 1968. The film's wide release would take place on March 18, 1968.

The title of the film for the Swedish release uses the translation of the name of the play within the story, Springtime for Hitler. As a result of its success, most of Mel Brooks' subsequent films in Swedish were given similar titles, despite being otherwise unrelated: Springtime for Mother-In-Law, 
Springtime for the Sheriff, Springtime for Frankenstein, Springtime for the Silent Movies, Springtime for the Lunatics, Springtime for World History, Springtime for Space, and Springtime for the Slum. The practice ended by the time Robin Hood: Men in Tights was released, at Brooks' request.

Reception 
When it was first released, the film received a mixed response and garnered some exceptionally harsh reviews, while others considered it a great success. One of the mixed reviews came from Renata Adler, who, writing for The New York Times, stated: "The Producers, which opened yesterday at the Fine Arts Theater, is a violently mixed bag. Some of it is shoddy and gross and cruel; the rest is funny in an entirely unexpected way." About the acting, she writes that Mostel is "overacting grotesquely under the direction of Mel Brooks" and that, in the role of Max Bialystock, he is "as gross and unfunny as only an enormous comedian bearing down too hard on some frail, tasteless routines can be". Co-star Wilder fares better and is called "wonderful", thanks to doing "fine", despite being "forced to be as loud and as fast as Mostel" and "[g]oing through long, infinitely variegated riffs and arpeggios of neuroticism", and playing his part "as though he were Dustin Hoffman being played by Danny Kaye". She also puts the movie into the bigger context of "contemporary" comedy and that it has the same "episodic, revue quality" in the way it is "not building laughter, but stringing it together skit after skit, some vile, some boffo". Her early conclusion, at the end of the first paragraph, is also a comparison to other comedic movies of the time, it reads: "[The Producers] is less delicate than Lenny Bruce, less funny than Dr. Strangelove, but much funnier than The Loved One or What's New Pussycat?"

The more critical and negative reviews partly targeted the directorial style and broad ethnic humor, but also commonly noted the bad taste and insensitivity of devising a broad comedy about two Jews conspiring to cheat theatrical investors by devising a designed-to-fail tasteless Broadway musical about Hitler only 23 years after the end of World War II. Among the most harsh critics were Stanley Kauffmann in The New Republic, who wrote that "the film bloats into sogginess" and "Springtime for Hitler ... doesn't even rise to the level of tastelessness", John Simon wrote The Producers "is a model of how not to make a comedy", and Pauline Kael who called it "amateurishly crude" in The New Yorker. Kael went on to say,

On the other hand, others considered the film to be a great success. Time magazine's reviewers wrote that the film was "hilariously funny" but pointed out that "the film is burdened with the kind of plot that demands resolution" but unfortunately "ends in a whimper of sentimentality". Although they labelled it "disjointed and inconsistent", they also praised it as "a wildly funny joy ride", and concluded by saying that "despite its bad moments, [it] is some of the funniest American cinema comedy in years". The film industry trade paper Variety wrote, "The film is unmatched in the scenes featuring Mostel and Wilder alone together, and several episodes with other actors are truly rare."

Over the years, the film has gained in stature. On Rotten Tomatoes, the film has an approval rating of 90% based on 72 reviews with an average rating of 8.1/10. The website's critical consensus reads, "A hilarious satire of the business side of Hollywood, The Producers is one of Mel Brooks' finest, as well as funniest films, featuring standout performances by Gene Wilder and Zero Mostel." On Metacritic, the film received a score of 96 based on 6 reviews, making it one of the highest-rated films on the site. In his review decades later, Roger Ebert claimed, "this is one of the funniest movies ever made". Ebert wrote, "I remember finding myself in an elevator with Brooks and his wife, actress Anne Bancroft, in New York City a few months after The Producers was released. A woman got onto the elevator, recognized him and said, 'I have to tell you, Mr. Brooks, that your movie is vulgar.' Brooks smiled benevolently. 'Lady,' he said, 'it rose below vulgarity.

The film was a sleeper hit at the U.S. box office.

Accolades

In 1996, the film was deemed "culturally, historically, or aesthetically significant" by the United States Library of Congress and selected for preservation in the National Film Registry.

The film is recognized by American Film Institute in these lists:
 2000: AFI's 100 Years...100 Laughs – #11
 2004: AFI's 100 Years...100 Songs:
 "Springtime for Hitler" – #80

Re-releases and adaptations 
In 2002, The Producers was re-released in three theaters by Rialto Pictures and earned $111,866 at the box office. As of 2007, the film continues to be distributed to art-film and repertory cinemas by Rialto.

Brooks has adapted the story twice more, as a Broadway musical (The Producers, 2001) and a film based on the musical (The Producers, 2005). He did not direct the latter, but served as a producer. Unlike the original film, it was not commercially successful.

This film has spawned several home media releases on VHS, Laserdisc, CED, and VCD from companies such as Magnetic Video, Embassy Home Entertainment, PolyGram Video, Speedy, and Lumiere Video. A 1997 letterbox edition Laserdisc was released by PolyGram Video, which served as the basis for the extremely rare 1998 PolyGram DVD release.

Metro-Goldwyn-Mayer, which owns video rights to select Embassy Pictures titles that ended up with Nelson Entertainment and Polygram, released The Producers on Region 1 DVD in 2002 and reissued in 2005 to coincide with the remake released that year. In 2013, MGM licensed the title to Shout! Factory to release a DVD and Blu-ray combo pack with a new HD transfer and newly produced bonus materials. StudioCanal, worldwide rights holder to all of the Embassy Pictures library, has also released several R2 DVD editions using a transfer slightly different from the North American DVD and Blu-Ray releases. In 2018, StudioCanal gave the film its European Blu-Ray debut in the UK, Germany, and Australia. The StudioCanal releases included most extras from the Shout! Factory release as well as a new 4K restoration for a 50th anniversary Blu-ray edition.

See also 

 The Butter and Egg Man
 Jojo Rabbit
 The Great Dictator
 
 List of American films of 1967
:Category:American satirical films
 Setting up to fail

References

External links 

 The Producers essay by Brian Scott Mednick at National Film Registry

 
 
 
 
 The Producers essay by Daniel Eagan in America's Film Legacy: The Authoritative Guide to the Landmark Movies in the National Film Registry, A&C Black, 2010 

1960s black comedy films
1967 LGBT-related films
1967 comedy films
1960s satirical films
American black comedy films
American LGBT-related films
American satirical films
Cultural depictions of Adolf Hitler
1960s English-language films
Films about con artists
Films about entertainers
Films about Jews and Judaism
Films about musical theatre
Films adapted into plays
Films directed by Mel Brooks
Films scored by John Morris
Films set in 1967
Films set in New York City
Films shot in New York City
Films whose writer won the Best Original Screenplay Academy Award
Jewish comedy and humor
LGBT-related black comedy films
Films about Nazis
Film controversies
LGBT-related controversies in film
Films with screenplays by Mel Brooks
United States National Film Registry films
Embassy Pictures films
Films about fraud
1967 directorial debut films
Censored films
1960s American films